The following is a list of the persons who served in the Vermont House of Representatives during the 2007-2008 session:

Members Listed by District

Addison-1
Steven B. Maier,  Democrat
Betty A. Nuovo,  Democrat

Addison-2
Willem W. Jewett,  Democrat

Addison-3
Gregory S. Clark,    Republican
Kitty Oxholm,   Republican (defeated 2008)

Addison-4
Michael Fisher,    Democrat
David Sharpe,   Democrat

Addison-5 
Christopher Bray, Democrat

Addison-Rutland-1 
Will Stevens,   Independent

Bennington-1 
Bill Botzow,  Democrat

Bennington-2-1 
Timothy R. Corcoran, II,   Democrat
Joseph L. Krawczyk, Jr.,   Republican

Bennington-2-2 
Anne H. Mook,   Democrat
Mary A. Morrissey,   Republican

Bennington-3 
Alice Miller,  Democrat

Bennington-4 
Judith Livingston,   Republican (defeated 2008)

Bennington-5 
Cynthia Browning,   Democrat

Bennington-Rutland-1 
Patti Komline,  Republican

Caledonia-1 
Leigh Larocque, Republican

Caledonia-2 
Lucy Leriche,   Democrat

Caledonia-3 
Donald E. Bostic,   Republican (retired 2008)
David T. Clark,   Republican

Caledonia-4 
Cola H. Hudson,   Republican (retired 2008)
Richard Lawrence,    Republican

Caledonia-Washington-1 
Steve Larrabee,   Republican (retired 2008)

Chittenden-1-1 
William J. Lippert,    Democrat

Chittenden-1-2 
Scott A. Orr,   Democrat

Chittenden-2 
Jim McCullough,   Democrat
Mary N. Peterson,  Democrat (retired 2008)

Chittenden-3-1 	
William N. Aswad,  Democrat
Kurt Wright,  Republican

Chittenden-3-2 
Mark Larson,  Democrat

Chittenden-3-3 
Jason P. Lorber,  Democrat
Rachel Weston,   Democrat

Chittenden-3-4 
Christopher A Pearson,   Progressive (defeated 2008)
David Zuckerman,  Progressive

Chittenden-3-5 
Johannah Leddy Donovan,    Democrat
Bill Keogh,   Democrat (lost primary, 2008)

Chittenden-3-6 
Kenneth W. Atkins,   Democrat
Clem Bissonnette,  Democrat

Chittenden-3-7 
Michele Kupersmith,   Democrat (retired 2008)

Chittenden-3-8 
Ann D. Pugh,  Democrat

Chittenden-3-9 
Albert C. "Sonny" Audette,  Democrat

Chittenden-3-10 
Helen Head,  Democrat

Chittenden-4 
Denise Begins Barnard,  Democrat (retired to run unsuccessfully for Senate, 2008)

Chittenden-5-1 
Joyce Errecart,  Republican (defeated 2008)

Chittenden-5-2 
Joan Lenes,   Democrat

Chittenden-6-1 
Debbie Evans,  Democrat
Linda K. Myers,   Republican

Chittenden-6-2 
Peter D. Hunt,  Democrat (retired 2008)
Tim Jerman,   Democrat

Chittenden-6-3 
Martha P. Heath,  Democrat

Chittenden-7-1 
Jim Condon,  Democrat
John Zenie,  Democrat

Chittenden-7-2 
Patrick M. Brennan,  Republican
Kristy Spengler,  Democrat

Chittenden-8 
William R. Frank,  Democrat
Gaye R. Symington,  Democrat  (House Speaker) (retired 2008 to unsuccessfully run for Governor)

Chittenden-9 
Reginald Godin,  Democrat (defeated 2008)
Donald H. Turner,   Republican

Essex-Caledonia 
Janice L. Peaslee,  Republican

Essex-Caledonia-Orleans 
William F. Johnson,  Republican

Franklin-1 
Carolyn Whitney Branagan, Republican
Gary Gilbert, Democratic

Franklin-2 
George R. Allard,  Democrat (lost primary, 2008)
Richard J. Howrigan,   Democrat

Franklin-3 
James Fitzgerald,   Democrat (retired 2008)
Kathleen C. Keenan,   Democrat

Franklin-4 
Avis L. Gervais,   Democrat (retired 2008)

Franklin-5 
Kathy LaBelle LaVoie,   Republican (retired 2008)
Michel Consejo,   Democrat

Franklin-6 
Norman H. McAllister,   Republican
Albert J. Perry,   Democrat (retired 2008)

Grand Isle-Chittenden-1-1 
Mitzi Johnson,   Democrat
Ira Trombley,   Democrat

Lamoille-1 
Heidi Scheuermann,  Republican

Lamoille-2 
Linda J. Martin,   Democrat

Lamoille-3 
Floyd W. Nease,   Democrat

Lamoille-4 
Richard A. Westman,   Republican

Lamoille-Washington-1 
Peter Peltz,   Democrat
Shap Smith,   Democrat (elected House Speaker in 2009-2010 session following Symington's departure)

Orange-1 
Susan Davis,   Progressive
Philip C. Winters,   Republican

Orange-2 
Sarah Copeland-Hanzas,   Democrat

Orange-Addison-1 
Patsy French,   Democrat
Jim Hutchinson,   Democrat (retired 2008)

Orange-Caledonia-1 
Harvey B. "Bud" Otterman, Jr.,  Republican (defeated 2008)

Orleans-1 
Robert Lewis,   Republican (replaced Loren Shawn)
Scott Wheeler,   Republican

Orleans-2 
Duncan F. Kilmartin,    Republican
Michael J. Marcotte,   Republican

Orleans-Caledonia-1 
John Morley,   Republican
John S. Rodgers,   Democrat

Orleans-Franklin-1 
Dexter Randall,   Progressive (defeated 2008)

Rutland-1-1 
Andrew P. Donaghy,   Republican

Rutland-1-2 
Joseph Baker,  Republican
Dave Potter,   Democrat

Rutland-2 
William Canfield,    Republican
Robert Helm,   Republican

Rutland-3 
Gail Fallar,   Democrat (retired 2008)

Rutland-4 
David A. Sunderland,   Republican (retired 2008)

Rutland-5-1 
Virginia McCormack,   Democrat (defeated 2008)

Rutland-5-2 
Peg Andrews,   Democrat

Rutland-5-3 
Steven James Howard,   Democrat

Rutland-5-4 
Gale Courcelle,   Democrat

Rutland-6 
Margaret Flory,    Republican

Rutland-7 
Joe Acinapura,   Republican

Rutland-8 
John W. Malcolm,  Democrat

Rutland-Windsor-1 
Harry L. Chen,  Democrat (retired 2008)

Washington-1 
Carol Hosford,   Democrat (defeated 2008)

Washington-2 
Anne B. Donahue,   Republican
Maxine Jo Grad,   Democrat

Washington-3-1 
Leo M. Valliere,   Republican (defeated 2008)

Washington-3-2 
Harry S. Monti,   Democrat (retired 2008)

Washington-3-3 
Pat McDonald,   Republican

Washington-4 
Thomas F. Koch,   Republican
Francis M. McFaun,   Republican

Washington-5 
Francis K. Brooks,   Democrat (retired 2007 to become sergeant at arms. His successor, Jon Anderson, was appointed by Gov. Jim Douglas and lost the 2008 Democratic primary.)
Warren F. Kitzmiller,  Democrat

Washington-6 
Janet Ancel,   Democrat

Washington-7 
Tony Klein,   Democrat

Washington-Chittenden-1 
Robert Dostis,   Democrat (retired 2008)
Sue Minter,   Democrat

Windham-1 
Patty O'Donnell,    Republican

Windham-2 
Ann Manwaring,   Democrat

Windham-3-1 
Virginia A. Milkey,   Democrat

Windham-3-2 
Daryl L. Pillsbury,   Independent (retired 2008)

Windham-3-3 
Sarah R. Edwards,   Progressive

Windham-4 
Michael J. Obuchowski,  Democrat
Carolyn W. Partridge,   Democrat

Windham-5 
David L. Deen,   Democrat
Mike Mrowicki,   Democrat

Windham-6 
Richard J. Marek,  Democrat

Windham-Bennington-1 
John Moran,   Democrat

Windham-Bennington-Windsor-1 
Vacant

Windsor-1-1 
Kathy Pellett,   Democrat

Windsor-1-2 
Alice M. Emmons,   Democrat
Clint Martin,    Democrat—Rep. Martin died on December 17, 2006 following a year-long fight with cancer.
Cynthia Martin, Democrat—On January 16, 2007, Governor Jim Douglas appointed Cynthia Martin (Clint Martin's widow) to serve out the balance of his term.

Windsor-2 
Ernest W. Shand,   Democrat

Windsor-3 
Donna G. Sweaney,   Democrat

Windsor-4 
Steven C. Adams,   Republican

Windsor-5 
Alison H. Clarkson,   Democrat

Windsor-6-1 
Mark Mitchell,   Democrat

Windsor-6-2 
John Clerkin,   Republican
Hilde Ojibway,   Democrat (retired 2008)

Windsor-Orange-1 
David Ainsworth,   Republican

Windsor-Orange-2 
Margaret Cheney,   Democrat
Jim Masland,   Democrat

Windsor-Rutland-1 
Dennis J. Devereux, Republican

Windsor-Rutland-2 
Sandy Haas,   Progressive

See also

Vermont Representative Districts, 2002-2012
Members of the Vermont Senate, 2005-2006 session

External links
List of Vermont 2006 General Election candidates
WCAX-TV's preliminary election results page